Podotheca gnaphalioides (common name, golden long-heads) is a small annual herb in the family Asteraceae, endemic to Western Australia.  It grows from 2 cm to 60 cm tall and is an often sticky herb, which is erect or decumbent (lying along the ground), and whose  yellow or orange-yellow flowers are seen from August to November. It grows on a variety of soils, but tends to prefer sandy soils.

Taxonomy
It was first described in 1845 by Robert Graham as Podotheca gnaphalioides.

References

External links
 Podotheca gnaphalioides Occurrence data from the Australasian Virtual Herbarium

gnaphalioides
Taxa named by Robert Graham
Flora of Western Australia
Plants described in 1841